The Lithuania men's national under-21 basketball team (Lithuanian: Lietuvos nacionalinė vaikinų jaunimo iki 21 krepšinio rinktinė), is the representative for Lithuania in international basketball competitions, and it is organized and run by the Lithuanian Basketball Federation. The Lithuania men's national under-21 basketball team represents Lithuania at the FIBA Under-21 World Championship before it being discontinued by FIBA. Lithuanian national team won the last held version of the FIBA Under-21 World Championship in 2005.

Competitive record

FIBA Under-21 World Championship

External links
 Lithuanian Basketball Federation (LKF)

References

M U20 and U21